Flight 266 may refer to:

United Airlines Flight 266, crashed on 18 January 1969
Bangkok Airways Flight 266, crashed on 4 August 2009

0266